Abrar Ahmed can refer to:

 Abrar Ahmed (Indian cricketer) (born 1971), Indian cricketer
 Abrar Ahmed (Pakistani cricketer) (born 1998), Pakistani cricketer
 Abrar Ahmed (INC politician), Indian politician
 Abrar Ahmed (Samajwadi politician), Indian politician